The Upper Manhattan Jazz Society is an album by saxophonist Charlie Rouse and trumpeter Benny Bailey which was recorded in 1981 and released on the Enja label in 1985.

Reception

The AllMusic review by Scott Yanow stated "The music is quite modern and none of the pieces have exactly caught on. However, the blend and contrast between Rouse and Bailey, plus the strong rhythm section, makes this a set of interest to collectors of acoustic jazz".

Track listing
 "Lil' Sherry" (Charles Rouse) – 4:50
 "Spelunke" (Fritz Pauer) – 9:36
 "Naima's Love Song" (John Hicks) – 8:02
 "Mr. McKee" (Albert Dailey) – 5:19
 "After the Morning" (Hicks) – 10:12

Personnel
Charlie Rouse - tenor saxophone
Benny Bailey – trumpet
Albert Dailey – piano
Buster Williams – bass
Keith Copeland – drums

References

1985 albums
Benny Bailey albums
Charlie Rouse albums
Enja Records albums